The Western Polans (also known as Polanes, Polanians; , derived from Old Slavic pole, "field" or "plain", from Proto-Indo-European *pleh₂- "flatland") were a West Slavic and Lechitic tribe, inhabiting the Warta River basin of the contemporary Greater Poland region starting in the 6th century. They were one of the main tribes in Central Europe and were closely related to the Vistulans, Masovians, Czechs and Slovaks.

History
In the 9th century, the Polans united several West Slavic (Lechitic) groups to the north of Great Moravia. The union led by the Piast dynasty developed into the Duchy of Poland, whose name derives from that of the Polans.

The earliest Polan rulers mentioned by name are the legendary figures of Piast the Wheelwright and Popiel (8th–9th centuries). The first historical ruler was Mieszko I (960–992), who enlarged the territory later named Poland by incorporating Masovia and conquering Silesia and the Vistulan lands of Lesser Poland.

The Dagome iudex document refers to Poland during Mieszko's reign as Civitas Schinesghe (The Gniezno State). The document describes the country as stretching between the Oder and Rus and between Lesser Poland ("Craccoa"/"Alemure") and the Baltic Sea. For more information, see Poland in the Early Middle Ages and History of Poland during the Piast dynasty.

Archeological findings reveal four major strongholds or gords (Polish gród) in the early Polans' state:
 Giecz – the place from where the Piasts gained control over other groups of Polans.
 Poznań – the largest and probably the main stronghold in the state.
 Gniezno – probably the religious centre of the state, although archeological findings proving this have not been excavated so far.
 Ostrów Lednicki – smaller stronghold halfway between Poznań and Gniezno.

The Western Polans were first mentioned around the year AD 1000. Eastern Polans, a similarly named Eastern Slavic tribe which lived near modern-day Kyiv were last documented in AD 944.

See also
 Polish tribes
 West Slavs
 List of Medieval Slavic tribes

References

Early medieval Poland
West Slavic tribes